Multilevel regression with poststratification (MRP) (sometimes called "Mister P") is a statistical technique used for correcting model estimates for known differences between a sample population (the population of the data you have), and a target population (a population you would like to estimate for).  For example, Wang et al. used survey data from Xbox gamers to predict U.S. presidential election results.  The Xbox gamers were 65% 18- to 29-year-olds and 93% male, while the electorate as a whole was 19% 18- to 29-year-olds and 47% male.

The poststratification refers to the process of adjusting the estimates, essentially a weighted average of estimates from all possible combinations of attributes (in this example age and sex, though there were more).  Each combination is sometimes called a "cell."  The multilevel regression is used to smooth noisy estimates in the cells with too little data by using overall or nearby averages.

One application is estimating preferences in sub-regions (e.g., states, individual constituencies) based on individual-level survey data gathered at other levels of aggregation (e.g., national surveys).

The technique and its advantages 

The technique essentially involves using data from, for example, censuses relating to various types of people corresponding to different characteristics (e.g., age, race), in a first step to estimate the relationship between those types and individual preferences (i.e., multi-level regression of the dataset). This relationship is then used in a second step to estimate the sub-regional preference based on the number of people having each type/characteristic in that sub-region (a process known as "poststratification"). In this way the need to perform surveys at sub-regional level, which can be expensive and impractical in an area (e.g., a country) with many sub-regions (e.g. counties, ridings, or states), is avoided. It also avoids issues with consistency of survey when comparing different surveys performed in different areas. Additionally, it allows the estimating of preference within a specific locality based on a survey taken across a wider area that includes relatively few people from the locality in question, or where the sample may be highly unrepresentative.

History 

The technique was originally developed by Gelman and T. Little in 1997, building upon ideas of Fay and Herriot and R. Little. It was subsequently expanded on by Park, Gelman, and Bafumi in 2004 and 2006. It was proposed for use in estimating US-state-level voter preference by Lax and Philips in 2009. Warshaw and Rodden subsequently proposed it for use in estimating district-level public opinion in 2012. Wang et al. subsequently used it for estimating the outcome of the 2012 US presidential election based on a survey of Xbox users, and it has also been proposed for use in the field of epidemiology.

YouGov used the technique to successfully predict the overall outcome of the 2017 UK general election, correctly predicting the result in 93% of constituencies.

Limitations and extensions 

MRP can be extended to estimating the change of opinion over time and when used to predict elections works best when used relatively close to the polling date, after nominations have closed.

Both the "multilevel regression" and "poststratification" ideas of MRP can be generalized.  Multilevel regression can be replaced by nonparametric regression or regularized prediction, and poststratification can be generalized to allow for non-census variables, i.e. poststratification totals that are estimated rather than being known.

References

Analysis of variance
Regression models